The Virginia Department of Behavioral Health and Developmental Services (DBHDS) is a state agency of the Commonwealth of Virginia.

Of the 13 state-run facilities, eight are mental health facilities, two are training centers to serve individuals with intellectual disability, one is a psychiatric facility for children and adolescents, one is a medical center, one is a psychiatric geriatric hospital and one is a center for behavioral rehabilitation (SVP). For placement in state facilities, patients are initially evaluated and referred from local CSBs.

Recent lawsuits
A lawsuit, filed the week of December 8, 2007, by the Virginia Office for Protection and Advocacy, requests the release of information about alleged abuses at two state facilities operated by DMHMRSAS.

Reading from a prepared statement, on December 7, 2007, Colleen Miller, director of the Virginia Office for Protection and Advocacy, expressed concerns about the deaths, saying, "If the allegations we have received are true, people with disabilities in state care may be at grave risk of harm and death."

References

External links
 

Mental Health
State departments of health of the United States
Medical and health organizations based in Virginia